Placentia West-Bellevue is a provincial electoral district in Newfoundland and Labrador, which is represented by one member in the Newfoundland and Labrador House of Assembly. It was contested for the first time in the 2015 provincial election.

The district was created following the 2015 redistribution which saw the elimination of the district of Bellevue. The district was largely preceded by the district of Burin-Placentia West which was abolished in 2015.

The district contains an intra-provincial ferry servicing South East Bight.

Members of the House of Assembly
The district has elected the following Members of the House of Assembly:

Election results

References

Newfoundland and Labrador provincial electoral districts